Kelsey Marie Robinson Cook (born June 25, 1992) is an American indoor volleyball player of the United States women's national volleyball team. Robinson won gold with the national team at the 2014 World Championship, the Rimini Volleyball Nations League, and the 2020 Tokyo Summer Olympics, and bronze at the 2016 Rio Olympic Games.

Early life
Robinson was raised in Bartlett, Illinois. She attended St. Francis High School and graduated in 2010.

Career
Robinson played college women's volleyball at University of Tennessee and University of Nebraska–Lincoln. In 2014, while at Nebraska, Robinson was named as one of the four finalists for the Honda Sports Award in volleyball.

Robinson was part of the USA national team that won the 2014 World Championship gold medal when their team defeated China 3–1 in the final match.

Robinson won the 2016–17 CEV Champions League silver medal with Imoco Volley Conegliano after losing the final match 0–3 to the Turkish VakıfBank Istanbul winning also the Best Outside Spiker award.

In May 2021, she was named to the 18-player roster for the FIVB Volleyball Nations League tournament. that was played May 25 – June 24 in Rimini, Italy. It was the only major international competition before the 2020 Summer Olympics in July.

On June 7, 2021, US National Team head coach Karch Kiraly announced she would be part of the 12-player Olympic roster for the 2020 Summer Olympics in Tokyo. USA won the gold medal for the first time in history.

Clubs
  Beijing (2014–2015)
  Leonas de Ponce (2015)
  Imoco Volley Conegliano (2015–2016)
  Beijing (2016–2017)
  Imoco Volley Conegliano (2017)
  Vakıfbank Istanbul (2017–2019) 
  Fenerbahçe (2019–2020)
  Guangdong Evergrande (2020–2021)
  Fenerbahçe (2021)
  Toyota Auto Body Queenseis (2021)
  Imoco Volley Conegliano (2022-)

Awards

Individual
 2015–16 Italian League "Most Valuable Player"
 2016–17 CEV Champions League "Best Outside Spiker"
 FIVB World Grand Prix 2015 "Best Outside Hitter"
2019 FIVB Volleyball Women’s World Cup "Best Outside Hitter"
2022 FIVB Women's World Club Volleyball Championships "Best Outside Hitter"

Clubs
 2015–16 Italian League Championship –  Champion, with Imoco Volley Conegliano
 2016–17 Italian Cup –  Champion, with Imoco Volley Conegliano
 2016–17 CEV Champions League –  Runner-Up, with Imoco Volley Conegliano
 2017–18 CEV Champions League –  Champion, with VakıfBank
 2017 Turkish Super Cup –  Champion, with VakıfBank
 2017–18 Turkish League –  Champion, with VakıfBank
 2018–19 Turkish League –  Champion, with VakıfBank

National team
 2014  FIVB World Championship 	
 2015  FIVB World Grand Prix	
 2015  FIVB Women's World Cup
 2015  Women's NORCECA Volleyball Continental Championship
 2016  Women's NORCECA Olympic Qualification Tournament
 2016  FIVB World Grand Prix
 2016  Summer Olympics
 2017  FIVB World Grand Champions Cup	
 2018  FIVB Volleyball Women's Nations League
 2019  FIVB Volleyball Women's Nations League
 2019   FIVB Women's Volleyball Intercontinental Olympic Qualifications Tournament (IOQT) - Qualified
 2019  FIVB Women's World Cup
 2019  Women's NORCECA Volleyball Continental Championship
 2021  FIVB Volleyball Women's Nations League
 2020  2020 Summer Olympics

References

External links
 Robinson's official bio at USA Volleyball

1992 births
Living people
American women's volleyball players
Nebraska Cornhuskers women's volleyball players
Sportspeople from Wheaton, Illinois
Tennessee Volunteers women's volleyball players
Volleyball players at the 2016 Summer Olympics
Volleyball players at the 2020 Summer Olympics
Olympic gold medalists for the United States in volleyball
Olympic bronze medalists for the United States in volleyball
Medalists at the 2016 Summer Olympics
Medalists at the 2020 Summer Olympics
People from Bartlett, Illinois
Liberos
Outside hitters
American expatriate sportspeople in China
American expatriate sportspeople in Italy
American expatriate sportspeople in Turkey
Expatriate volleyball players in China
Expatriate volleyball players in Italy
Expatriate volleyball players in Turkey
VakıfBank S.K. volleyballers